Justicia americana, the American water-willow, is a herbaceous, aquatic flowering plant in the family Acanthaceae native to North America. It is the hardiest species in the genus Justicia, the other members of which being largely tropical and subtropical, and it is able to survive as far north as USDA zone 4. It is common throughout its range.

Color ranges from white to pale lavender with the upper corolla lip pale violet or white, arching over the lower lip mottled in dark purple. The lateral lobes are unadorned or slightly blushed. The anthers are purplish-red rather than the usual yellow. Flowering is from May to October. The fruit of this plant is a small brown capsule.

The creeping rhizome allows Justicia americana to form large colonies on or near the shorelines of still or slow waters in lakes and rivers, and on rocky riffles and shoals in faster flowing rivers.  Its rhizomes and roots provide important spawning sites for many fish species and habitat for invertebrates.

References

americana
Flora of the United States
Freshwater plants
Plants described in 1753
Taxa named by Carl Linnaeus